Anaphosia cyanogramma is a moth of the subfamily Arctiinae. It was described by George Hampson in 1903. It is found in the Republic of the Congo, the Democratic Republic of the Congo, Malawi and Zimbabwe.

References

Lepidoptera of the Democratic Republic of the Congo
Lepidoptera of Malawi
Lepidoptera of the Republic of the Congo
Lepidoptera of Zimbabwe
Moths of Sub-Saharan Africa
Moths described in 1903
Lithosiini